James Lockwood may refer to:

 James Lockwood (British politician) (1888–1972), British politician
 James Lockwood (Connecticut politician) (1683–1769), member of the Connecticut House of Representatives from Norwalk in several nonconsecutive sessions between 1721 and 1751
 James Lockwood (rugby league), professional rugby league footballer
 James B. Lockwood (1852–1884), American soldier and explorer
 James Henry Lockwood (1793–1857), American businessman, fur trapper, lawyer, and public official